Ancylosis argentescens is a moth of the family Pyralidae. It was described by George Hampson in 1912 and is found in Sri Lanka.

References

Moths described in 1912
Phycitini
Moths of Sri Lanka